Mathilde Nelles (born 7 October 1997) is a Belgian alpine ski racer.

She competed at the 2015 World Championships in Beaver Creek, USA, where she placed 47th in the slalom.

References

1997 births
Belgian female alpine skiers
Living people
Place of birth missing (living people)